Indus Capital Partners is a hedge fund focused on Asian markets. The company, founded in 2000, is based in New York City, and has offices in London, Tokyo, Hong Kong, and San Francisco.

Indus was founded by David Kowitz and Sheldon Kasowitz, who had previously worked for George Soros as fund managers.

They use a long-short equity strategy in Asian and European markets.

References

External links 
Indus Capital Partners, LLC

Hedge fund firms in New York City
Financial services companies established in 2000